The Women's triple jump at the 2014 Commonwealth Games, as part of the athletics programme, took place at Hampden Park on 28 and 29 July 2014.

Records

Results

Qualifying round

Final

References

Women's triple jump
2014
2014 in women's athletics